Qaleh Cheh or Qalehcheh may refer to:
 Qalehcheh, Ardabil
 Qalehcheh, Lordegan, Chaharmahal and Bakhtiari Province
 Qalehcheh, Khanmirza, Lordegan County, Chaharmahal and Bakhtiari Province
 Qalehcheh, East Azerbaijan
 Qaleh Cheh, Golestan
 Qaleh Cheh, Kerman
 Qalehcheh-ye Muzarm, Khuzestan Province
 Qalehcheh, Markazi
 Qaleh Cheh, North Khorasan
 Qalehcheh, Razavi Khorasan

See also
 Qalehchi (disambiguation)